Junior Tia-Kilifi (JTK) (born 24 April 1988) is a Samoa international former professional rugby league footballer who played in the 2000s and 2010s for the Penrith Panthers and the Canterbury-Bankstown Bulldogs in the National Rugby League.

Background
Tia-Kilifi was born in Auckland, New Zealand.  He attended Chifley College in Mt Druitt, and St Dominics College in Penrith. Tia-Kilifi played his junior footy for the Minchinbury Jets.

Playing career
Tia-Kilifi made his debut with the Penrith Panthers in 2009, but left the club at the end of the season to sign a  two-year contract with the Bulldogs, commencing at the start of the 2010 season.

Tia-Kilifi mostly played for Canterbury's feeder side in the NSW Cup. At the end of the 2011 season, Tia-Kilifi moved back to Penrith in a one-year contract. He then renewed his contract for another season.

In 2015, Tia-Kilifi played for the Auburn Warriors in the Ron Massey Cup.  In The 2017 Ron Massey Cup season, Kilifi played for foundation club The Western Suburbs Magpies.

International career
Tia-Kilifi was called up for the Samoa national rugby league team in 2006, but never played.

On 8 September 2014, Tia-Kilifi was named in the Samoa train-on squad for the 2014 Four Nations,

References

External links
Canterbury Bulldogs profile
Penrith Panthers profile

1988 births
Living people
New Zealand rugby league players
New Zealand sportspeople of Samoan descent
Samoa national rugby league team players
Samoan rugby league players
Penrith Panthers players
Canterbury-Bankstown Bulldogs players
Illawarra Cutters players
Wyong Roos players
Rugby league players from Auckland
Rugby league wingers
New Zealand expatriate rugby league players
Expatriate rugby league players in Australia
New Zealand expatriate sportspeople in Australia